Stainfield Priory was a Benedictine nunnery at Stainfield in the North of  Lincolnshire, England, between Wragby and Fiskerton.

The priory of St Mary at Stainfield was the only nunnery of the Benedictine order in Lincolnshire.  It was a small establishment intended to house up to 20 nuns, founded in around 1154 by Henry or William Percy, which survived until the dissolution in 1536.

References
Both references contain a wealth of further detail.

Monasteries in Lincolnshire